Charles Frank Lappenbusch Sr. (May 18, 1908 – September 30, 1996) was an American athlete and sports coach. He was best known for his time at Western Washington University, at which he served from 1933 to 1975 and coached football, basketball, baseball, tennis and golf.

A native of Washington, Lappenbusch attended the University of Puget Sound for a time before transferring to the University of Washington. He played as a lineman for both schools' football teams, and was named All-Pacific Northwest as a senior in 1930. Afterwards, he served for one year as an assistant football coach for Washington. In 1932, Lappenbusch became athletic director and head coach at Albany College (now known as Lewis & Clark College), a position in which he served for one season.

Lappenbusch was hired at Bellingham Normal School (now Western Washington University) in 1933, and went on to serve in various positions through 1975. He coached football for 20 seasons, and was their all-time wins leader at the time of his retirement in 1955. He also coached basketball for 13 seasons, baseball for six years, tennis for 22 years, and golf two seasons, and was a member of the physical education department for 42 years. Lappenbusch was inducted into the NAIA Hall of Fame in 1961 and received national recognition for his development of the "Straight Line Philosophy," in addition to other innovations.

Early life and education
Lappenbusch was born on May 18, 1908, at Lake Tapps in Washington, United States. He attended the University of Puget Sound for two years before transferring to the University of Washington to major in pre-med. He played right tackle for Puget Sound under coach Cac Hubbard and was awarded a varsity jacket as well as the Mahncke Award for highest scholastic average. Lappenbusch played for Washington as a guard in 1930 and was selected first-team All-Pacific Northwest by Associated Press (AP) despite missing several games due to injury. Some sources also stated that he was named an All-American. During his time at Puget Sound and Washington, he also participated in basketball, baseball, and track and field.

Coaching career
After graduating from the University of Washington, from which he received a bachelor's degree and master's degree, Lappenbusch was hired by the school as assistant line coach in 1931. He also assisted in coaching the freshman team that year. The following year, Lappenbusch began serving as athletic director, physical education director, and head football coach at Albany College (now known as Lewis & Clark College).

After one season in the position, Lappenbusch left for Bellingham Normal School (now known as Western Washington University). "I had been canned by the depression," he later recalled. "I was teaching and coaching at Albany College in Oregon for $2,400 when they ran out of money. There was an opening [at Bellingham Normal] and I felt fortunate to get the job for the same money I was receiving, especially since the fellow who replaced me at Albany was cut to $500. That $2400 then was a pretty good salary." He began as athletic director and football coach.

Lappenbusch went on to serve with the school for 42 years. He coached the football team for 20 seasons, from 1933 to 1955 (as they did not play from 1943 to 1945 due to World War II), the tennis team for 22 years, the basketball team for 13 seasons, the baseball team for six seasons, and the golf team for two years. He also was a member of the physical education department until retiring in 1975.

A 1961 inductee into the NAIA Hall of Fame, Lappenbusch compiled an 81–62–15 record as Western Washington's football coach. His record was at the time the best in school history and in 1938 his team posted their only-ever undefeated, untied season. Lappenbusch also made several innovations to the game, including: being among the first coaches to provide his players with long underwear and gloves for cold weather; had his players take vitamins, 50 years before it became common; and redesigned protective equipment which, although was rejected, was introduced by others almost exactly the same several years later and accepted. Lappenbusch also designed a type of mass produced varsity jacket and was the author of the "Straight Line Philosophy" in football and basketball which received national recognition.

Lappenbusch's Straight Line theories were based off an observation from a coach that he served with at Washington in 1931: "Don't give a man a job he can't do." He was twice invited to speak at the NCAA convention about his Straight Line plans and it was immensely popular, influencing many coaches of the day including Frank Leahy of Notre Dame. He wrote several books on the topic and was called a "genius" by many players that he coached, although "his theories and lectures were so complicated that those in attendance often didn't know whether to take notes or laugh," according to The Bellingham Herald.

Personal life and death
Lappenbusch was "frugal, allergic to a host of different foods and often absent-minded." Sometimes he would get "so wrapped up in thinking" that he'd walk home and forget that he left his car at work. He was inducted into the Western Washington Athletic Hall of Fame in 1976 and died in September 1996 in Enumclaw, Washington.

Works

Head coaching record

Football

References

Notes

Citations

1908 births
1996 deaths
American football guards
American football tackles
American tennis coaches
Lewis & Clark Pioneers athletic directors
Lewis & Clark Pioneers football coaches
Puget Sound Loggers baseball players
Puget Sound Loggers football players
Puget Sound Loggers men's basketball players
Washington Huskies baseball players
Washington Huskies football coaches
Washington Huskies football players
Washington Huskies men's basketball players
Washington Huskies men's track and field athletes
Western Washington Vikings athletic directors
Western Washington Vikings baseball coaches
Western Washington Vikings men's basketball coaches
Western Washington Vikings football coaches
College golf coaches in the United States
College tennis coaches in the United States
People from Pierce County, Washington
Coaches of American football from Washington (state)
Players of American football from Washington (state)
Baseball coaches from Washington (state)
Baseball players from Washington (state)
Basketball coaches from Washington (state)
Basketball players from Washington (state)
Track and field athletes from Washington (state)